is a national university in Shizuoka Prefecture, Japan.

Shizuoka University is well known in the field of engineering, in creative innovation, and in the invention of next generation technology, with the prestigious international exchange of laboratories in these fields. One of the notable persons is the father of Japanese television, Kenjiro Takayanagi. Soichiro Honda, the founding president of the global corporation Honda Motor Co. Ltd., studied in Hamamatsu College of Technology (now Shizuoka University School of Engineering). Heihachiro Horiuchi, founder of Hamamatsu Photonics, is an alumnus of the Hamamatsu Kōtō Kōgyō Gakkō (today’s Electronics Institute of Shizuoka University) and a disciple of Prof. Kenjiro Takayanagi. Shizuoka University also enters into partnership agreement with various corporations, such as Yamaha Motor Co., Ltd. Various performances and inventions of students and graduates are cited in TV mass media.

Graduates and fellows of Shizuoka University become successful leaders in different areas. Nakasone Yasuhiro, who was a Prime Minister of Japan and a world leader, studied in the prestigious Shizuoka High School (now part of Shizuoka University). Gayu Uesugi, Chairman of Mitsubishi Motors North America, has a master's degree in Engineering from Shizuoka University. Moreover, Osamu Suzuki, the Chairman of Suzuki Motor Corporation, was conferred with an honorary doctorate. Dr. Yuan-Tseh Lee, Nobel Prize awardee in Chemistry, was awarded with Doctor (Honoris Causa) degree.

The Environmental Leaders Program (ELSU) was launched to foster "Environmental Leader Meisters" for advancing the protection of the ecosystem and coexistence of human society. ELSU focuses on resolving issues to rejuvenate the environment in Asian and African regions. Moreover, Asia Bridge Program is established to educate future global leaders in science, business and society.

Shizuoka University has very high (VH) research intensity and belongs to the top universities in Japan, Asia and the world according to various university ranking schemes, such as Quacquarelli Symonds (QS), Center for World University Rankings (CWUR) and University Ranking by Academic Performance (URAP). In Thomson Reuters Science Watch Report (2005–2009), Shizuoka University is a high-impact institution in materials science. Furthermore, the Research and Education Center of Nanovision Science is part of the Japan Society for the Promotion of Science (JSPS) 21st Century Center of Excellence (COE) Program. The Faculty of Informatics is recognized as a distinctive university educational program by the Japan's Ministry of Education, Culture, Sports, Science and Technology (MEXT).

The university consists of six faculties: Humanities and Social Sciences, Education, Informatics, Science, Engineering, and Agriculture. It consists of two main campuses, in the cities of Shizuoka and Hamamatsu (Engineering and Informatics faculties). National universities in Japan tend to be held in higher regard in higher education than private or public universities. National universities are highly selective in student admissions. The Ministry of Education, Culture, Sports, Science and Technology (MEXT) of the Japanese Government assures quality of higher education in national universities.

History 
The university was founded on May 31, 1949, as an incorporation of several local educational institutions: Shizuoka High School, Shizuoka Teacher Training Institutes I & II, a Young Teacher Training Institute, and Hamamatsu College of Technology. At this initial stage, only the Education and Engineering faculties existed.

In 1951, the Shizuoka Prefectural Agricultural College was amalgamated into the fold, resulting in the creation of a new Agriculture faculty. 1965 brought on a structural rearrangement, combining several smaller schools within other faculties to initiate separate Science and Humanities faculties. With the coming of the digital age in 1995, an Informatics Faculty was added.

In 2006, the university conducted research once more on its internal structure and looked at making large changes including reorganisation of the humanities and education faculties and an increase of student places in the legal graduate school.

Symbols 
The campus mascot first appeared on the university's home page in the fall of 2003. To facilitate more active use of this mascot, suggestions for a name were taken, and "Shizuppi" was chosen.

Emblem design and concept:

The emblem design depicts the vast natural stage upon which the university is situated. In the background rises the massive Mt. Fuji and the smaller Mt. Hoei as visible from the university campus, while in the foreground are the billowing waves of the Sea of Enshū and Suruga Bay.
 Mt. Fuji – This signature mountain of Shizuoka Prefecture and Japan as a whole symbolizes lofty dignity and solemnity.
 Billowing waves – The billowing waves of the Sea of Enshū and Suruga Bay represent the ocean, origin of all life, and symbolize ceaseless creation and progress.
 Circular form – The circular form of the emblem symbolizes the hope for harmonious human and academic progress within a bountiful natural environment.

Faculties 

 Faculty of Humanities and Social Sciences
 Department of Social and Human Studies (anthropology, sociology, psychology, cultural anthropology, and history)
 Department of Language and Literature (Japanese and Asian languages and literature, European and American languages and literature, and comparative linguistics and culture)
 Department of Law (also has international law, business law, legal science, and politics)
 Department of Economics (also has corporate economics and political economy)
 Faculty of Education
 Teacher Training Course
 Lifelong Education Course
 Integrated Sciences and Technology Education Course
 Art and Culture Course
 Faculty of Informatics
 Department of Computer Science
 Department of Behavior Informatics
 Department of Information Arts
 Faculty of Sciences
 Department of Mathematics
 Department of Physics
 Department of Chemistry
 Department of Biological Science
 Department of Geo-sciences
 Faculty of Engineering
 Department of Mechanical Engineering
 Department of Electrical and Electronic Engineering
 Department of Electronics and Materials Science
 Department of Applied Chemistry and Biochemical Engineering
 Department of Mathematical and Systems Engineering
 Department of Management of Business Development
 Center for Creative Engineers
 Faculty of Agriculture
 Department of Biological and Environmental Science
 Department of Environment and Forest Resources Science
 Department of Applied Biological Chemistry

Graduate school 
 Graduate School of Humanities and Social Sciences
 Graduate School of Education (with Doctor's Programs and Professional Degree Programs)
 Graduate School of Informatics
 Graduate School of Science
 Graduate School of Engineering
 Graduate School of Agriculture

The Doctoral Course in the United Graduate School of Agricultural Science is co-offered by Gifu University.

 Shizuoka Law School
 Graduate School of Science and Technology (with Doctor's Programs and courses in English)
Department of Nanovision Technology
Department of Optoelectronics and Nanostructure Science
Department of Information Science and Technology
Department of Environment and Energy System
Department of Bioscience

Shizuoka University offers Double Degree Program through the Inter-Academia Community. The Doctoral Program under the Graduate School of Science and Technology (GSST), in cooperation with European and Asian universities, is designated by Japan's Ministry of Education, Culture, Sports, Science and Technology (MEXT) as part of the International Priority Graduate Programs (PGP) - Advanced Graduate Courses for International Students. GSST has academic agreements with various universities, such as Meiji University.

Research Institutes 
Research Institute of Electronics
International Nanovision Research Center
Nanodevices and Nanomaterials Division
Interdisciplinary Science Division

The Research Institute of Electronics, established in 1965, is the first affiliated scientific research institute of its type to be established by a university under the postwar education system. The Institute receives world-wide recognition for its research activities. In 2004, the Institute launched its Research and Education Center of Nanovision Science as part of the Japan Society for the Promotion of Science's 21st Century Center of Excellence (COE) Program, and is playing a central role in the development of the new nanotechnology-based imaging science. This "Nanovision Science" implies the science as a base for new technology to innovate vision technology based on nanotechnology.

The Institute played an important role in the "Intellectual Cluster in Hamamatsu Region (Optronics Cluster)" project. The results in the Optronics Cluster I were ranked as No. 2, resulting in Shoji Kawahito's receiving the "Award of Ministry of Education, Culture, Sports, Science, and Technology". The Optronics Cluster II has started since 2007. Moreover, Hamamatsu is a famous city where many venture business companies, which the Institute contributed to, were born.

Research Institute of Green Science and Technology

Affiliated schools 
Shizuoka Elementary School 
Hamamatsu Elementary School
Shizuoka Junior High School
Shimada Junior High School 
Hamamatsu Junior High School
School for students with special needs 
Kindergarten

Institute for Joint Research and Education 
Shizuoka University Education Development Center
Student Support Center
Center for Research and Development in Admissions
International Center
Institute for Genetic Research and Biotechnology
Center for Instrumental Analysis
Center for Information Infrastructure
Center for Integrated Research and Education of Natural Hazards
Hamamatsu Campus Center for Instrumental Analysis

Shizuoka University also has a Psychological Service Center which provides mental health-related consultations to the community, and Campus Museum which is utilized to curate and preserve Shizuoka University's research-related materials and to promote their use.

Campuses

Shizuoka Campus 

Address: 836 Ōya, Suruga-ku, Shizuoka City, Shizuoka Prefecture.

Shizuoka campus overlooks Shizuoka City and Suruga Bay.

Hamamatsu Campus 
Address: 3-5-1 Johoku, Naka-ku, Hamamatsu City, Shizuoka Prefecture.

Shizuoka University's Hamamatsu Campus is situated amid the urban environment of Hamamatsu City, a major center of manufacturing technology.

Studying in Shizuoka University 
There are approximately 9,000 students in 6 faculties and 1,600 students in 8 graduate schools in Shizuoka Daigaku (as of May 1, 2010). Various student organizations, circles and clubs are active in the university, such as the Shizuoka University Motors. Shizuoka University also has international residence and dormitories for students.

Some of the partner universities 
  University of Nebraska at Omaha, USA
  OnTechU, Canada
  University of Alberta, Canada
  Budapest University of Technology and Economics, Hungary
  Óbuda University, Hungary
  Comenius University, Slovakia
  Warsaw University of Technology, Poland
  Kasetsart University, Thailand
  Thammasat University, Thailand
  Miryang National University, Korea
  Yeungnam University, Korea
  Pusan National University, Korea
  Korea University, Korea
  Kyungpook National University, Korea
  Nanjing University, China
  Fudan University, China
  Xidian University, China
  Zhejiang University, China
  Huazhong University of Science and Technology, China
  Chinese Academy of Sciences, China
  Southwest Forestry University, China
  Gomel State University, Belarus
  National Taipei University of Technology, Taiwan
  Huế University, Vietnam
  University of Indonesia, Indonesia
  Gadjah Mada University, Indonesia
  Bandung Institute of Technology, Indonesia
  Anna University, India
  Sri Ramaswamy Memorial University, India
  Taras Shevchenko National University of Kyiv, Ukraine
  Riga Technical University, Latvia
  Masaryk University, Czech Republic
  Sofia University, Bulgaria
  University of Wuppertal, Germany
  Jena University of Applied Sciences, Germany
  Braunschweig University of Technology, Germany
  Nancy 2 University, France
  Saint Petersburg State Institute of Technology, Russia 
  Alexandru Ioan Cuza University, Romania

Shizuoka University has exchange agreements with various universities in Asia, North America and Europe (37 universities from 18 countries as of April 15, 2013).

See also
 University of Shizuoka, a public university in Shizuoka City

References

External links

Shizuoka University
International Center - especially for international students
Graduate School of Science and Technology
Inter-Academia Community and Double Degree Program
NIFEE
Environmental Leaders Program - scholarships available
Innovation and Joint Research Center - for inventors, industry and entrepreneurs
Takayanagi Memorial Hall

Buildings and structures in Shizuoka (city)
Universities and colleges in Shizuoka Prefecture
Japanese national universities
Educational institutions established in 1949
1949 establishments in Japan